Kwese may be,

Kwese language
Kwesé Sports